Severus II bar Masqeh was the Patriarch of Antioch and head of the Syriac Orthodox Church from 667/668 until his death in 684. He is commemorated as a saint by the Syriac Orthodox Church.

Biography
Severus was a monk at the monastery of Asphulos near Reshʿayna, and later became the archbishop of Amida. He succeeded Theodore as patriarch of Antioch in 667/668 (AG 979), and was consecrated by John Bar ‘Ebrayta, archbishop of Tarsus. 667/668 (AG 979) is given as the year of Severus' consecration by Bar Hebraeus in his Ecclesiastical History, whilst Michael the Syrian gives 666/667 (AG 978), and the Chronicle of 819, the Chronicle of 846, and the Zuqnin Chronicle place it in 664/665 (AG 976).

In Severus' tenure as patriarch, he attempted to centralise authority in the church by removing the right of the archbishops to ordain suffragan bishops. A number of bishops opposed Severus' challenge to the archbishops' rights, and united under the leadership of Sergius Zkhunoyo, bishop of Germanicia, Ananias of Qartmin, archbishop of Damascus, and Gabriel, bishop of Reshʿayna, and asserted that this right had been established by the fourth canon of the Council of Nicaea in 325, whereas Severus argued this right had been abolished by the Council of Chalcedon in 451. Severus convened a synod at Beth Tellat to settle the dispute in 679/680, but was preempted by his opponents, who declared his deposition as patriarch of Antioch and excommunicated him, to which he responded by excommunicating them also.

The schism endured for four years until Severus, on his deathbed, wrote to John, archbishop of the monastery of Saint Matthew, to authorise him and the bishops Joseph and Sergius to restore communion to his opponents on the condition that they repented and renounced their actions against him. Severus subsequently died in 684 (AG 995), according to Michael the Syrian. Other sources date Severus' death differently, as the Chronicle of 846 and the Zuqnin Chronicle place Severus' death in 682/683 (AG 994), and Bar Hebraeus gives 679/680 (AG 991).

Works
Severus is known to have written a number of propitiatory prayers (pl. ).

References

Bibliography

Syriac Patriarchs of Antioch from 512 to 1783
Year of birth unknown
684 deaths
7th-century Oriental Orthodox archbishops
7th-century births
7th-century Syrian people
Christians from the Umayyad Caliphate
Syriac Orthodox Church saints
7th-century Christian saints
7th-century writers